Amararama is one of the five Pancharama Kshetras that are sacred to the Hindu god Shiva. The temple is located in Amaravathi town of Palnadu district in the Indian state of Andhra Pradesh. Amareswara Swamy or Amaralingeswara Swamy refers to Lord Shiva in this temple. The temple is situated on the  southern bank of Krishna River. The consort of Lord Amareswara Swamy is Bala Chamundika. The Sivalinga at this place is installed and established by Lord Indra.

The Deity
The Sivalinga here is very tall that the archakas mount a pedestal platform, and perform the daily rituals as well as Abhisheka. The top of the Linga has a red stain on it. According to legend, Sivalinga was growing up in size and to stop its growth, a nail has been hit onto the top of the Sivalinga. When the nail dug into the Linga, blood oozed from the Sivalinga.

History

Vasireddy Venkatadri Naidu, King of  Chintapalli and later Dharanikota, was a great devotee of Amareswara. He expanded and renovated the temple. The popular legend has it that once during the course of putting down a rebellion in his land the King had to have recourse to a massacre of the Chenchus, whereupon he lost his mental peace, which he regained only when he came to Amaravati. He shifted his place from Chintapalli to Amaravati in 1796, and devoted his entire life, time and revenues to building temples for Lord Siva. He renovated the Amareswaraswamy temple here, engaged nine learned archakas for the daily archana of the Lord, and provided them with all the needs of livelihood, including  of land to each. The temple as it stands owes much to him.

As per Legend, the demon king named Tarakasura defeated the gods after being awarded a boon by Lord Shiva. Shiva vowed to kill the demons and hence the gods came to reside here and since then the place came to be called Amaravati. Lord Shiva is worshipped as Amareswara with his consort Bala Chamundika, who is considered as the fourth of the 18 goddesses.
srikrishnadevaraya had visited this temple after the war of kodapalli

Architecture
Amaravati temple has also a wealth of inscriptions on its walls like those of the Kota chiefs of Amaravati and of Sri Krishandevaraya, the great Vijayanagara emperor. On a pillar in the Mukhamantapa the wife of Proli Nayudu, who was minister of Kota King Ketaraja, has left an inscription.

Festivals

The main festivals in the temple are the Mahashivaratri, which comes in the Magha Bahula Dasami and the Navaratri and the Kalyana Utsavas. 
Amaravati is thus an important Kshetra situated at a particularly sacred spot of the holy river Krishna and is a consecrated place of worship, of importance to Hinduism.

Transport 

The temple is located at a distance of 40km from Guntur. State run APS RTC runs bus services from Guntur, Vijayawada and Mangalagiri to this temple.

Renovation 

The Gopuram of the temple is renovated as it developed cracks in masonry due to the passage of Heavy equipment. It was rebuilt at a cost of Rs.1.56 crore. The former structure was renovated in 1796 by the local ruler Vasireddy Venkatadri Nayudu. During this renovation ancient artifacts dating back 1800 years are found in the Foundation pits.

References

External links 

 Amararama

Hindu temples in Guntur district
Hindu holy cities
Hindu pilgrimage sites in India

Pancharama Kshetras
Tourist attractions in Guntur district
Shiva temples in Andhra Pradesh